David Coates (24 December 1946 – 7 August 2018) was a British-American political economist.

Coates earned an undergraduate degree at the University of York in 1967 and completed a Doctor of Philosophy degree at the University of Oxford in 1979. He began teaching prior to earning an advanced degree, serving as lecturer at the University of York from 1970 to 1971, and moving to the University of Leeds in 1977. Coates left Leeds in 1995 for the University of Manchester, and became the Worrell Chair in Anglo-American Studies at Wake Forest University in 1999. He died on 7 August 2018, aged 71.

Selected bibliography
The Labour Party and the Struggle for Socialism, Cambridge University Press, 1975.
Labour in Power?: A Study of the Labour Government 1974-1979, Prentice Hall, 1980.
A Socialist Anatomy of Britain, Polity Press, 1985.
The Crisis of Labour: Industrial Relations and the State in Modern Britain, Philip Allan, 1989.
The Question of UK Decline: The Economy, State and Society, Harvester-Wheatsheaf, 1993.
Industrial Policy in Britain, Macmillan, 1996.
Models of Capitalism: Growth and Stagnation in the Modern Era, Polity Press, 2000.
New Labour in Power, Manchester University Press, 2000.
Blair’s War, Polity Press, 2004.
Prolonged Labour: The Slow Birth of New Labour in Britain, Palgrave Macmillan, 2005.
Answering Back: Liberal Responses to Conservative Arguments, Continuum, 2010.
Making the Progressive Case: Towards a Stronger US Economy, Continuum, 2011.
America in the Shadow of Empires, Palgrave Macmillan, 2014. 
Capitalism: The Basics Routledge, 2015.
Observing Obama in Real Time Volume 1: Pursuing the Progressive Case, Library Partners Press, 2016.
Observing Obama in Real Time Volume 2: The Progressive Case Stalled, Library Partners Press, 2016.
Reflections on the Future of the Left, Agenda Publishing, 2017.
Flawed Capitalism: The Anglo-American Condition and its Resolution, Agenda Publishing, 2018.

References

External links
 
 Curriculum vitae
 Huffington Post author profile
 Social Europe author profile

1946 births
2018 deaths
Alumni of Nuffield College, Oxford
Alumni of the University of York
Academics of the University of Leeds
Academics of the University of Manchester
Academics of the University of York
American political scientists
British expatriate academics in the United States
British political scientists
HuffPost writers and columnists
Political economists
Wake Forest University faculty
People from Tottington, Greater Manchester